Sweeney Astray: A Version from the Irish is a version of the Irish poem Buile Shuibhne written by Seamus Heaney, based on an earlier translation by J.G. O'Keeffe. The work was first published in 1983 and won the 1985 PEN Translation Prize for verse, the first year the prize was awarded as such. Photographer Rachel Giese later took revised portions of the poem to accompany a collection of her photos titled Sweeney's Flight.

References

1983 books
20th-century Irish literature
1983 poems
Irish poems
Works by Seamus Heaney